Brydone is a small farming locality in Southland, New Zealand, south west of Mataura. It was named after Thomas Brydone, the superintendent of Australia and New Zealand Land Company. He was the founder of the frozen meat and dairy industry in New Zealand and the dairy factory at Edendale, New Zealand, near Brydone, was established with his encouragement.

References

Populated places in Southland, New Zealand